WSHN (1550 AM) was a radio station licensed to serve Fremont, Michigan, United States. The station ran 1,000 watts, during daytime hours only.

History
WSHN began broadcasting May 23, 1961, and was owned by Rev. Stuart P. Noordyk.

On October 5, 2012, the Federal Communications Commission cancelled WSHN's license and deleted the station's call sign from its database.

References

SHN
Newaygo County, Michigan
Radio stations established in 1961
1961 establishments in Michigan
Defunct radio stations in the United States
Radio stations disestablished in 2012
2012 disestablishments in Michigan
SHN
SHN